The agiarut (Inuktitut syllabics:  also known as the Eskimo fiddle) is a bowed instrument native to the Inuit culture of Canada and Alaska.

According to musicologist Beverley Cavanagh, agiarut is the name for a European fiddle, while tautirut is the name for the indigenous bowed box zither.  The modern Western fiddle may be referred to as agiaq ("shaman's rubbing stone").

References 

Bowed instruments
Inuit musical instruments